The Master of Revenge is a 2016 South Korean television series starring Chun Jung-myung, Jo Jae-hyun, Jeong Yoo-mi, Lee Sang-yeob and Gong Seung-yeon. It aired on KBS2 from April 27, 2016 to June 30, 2016 on Wednesdays and Thursdays at 21:55 for 20 episodes, replacing Descendants of the Sun.

Synopsis
A man whose name and life were taken from him seeks revenge. To do so, he must attempt to become a master noodle cook, or a god of noodles.

Cast

Main characters
Chun Jung-myung as Moo Myung-yi / Choi Soon-seok
 as child Moo Myung-yi
Cho Jae-hyun as Kim Gil-do
Park Chan as child Kim Gil-do
Baro as teen Kim Gil-do
Jeong Yoo-mi as Chae Yeo-kyung
Choi Ji-won as child Chae Yeo-kyung
Lee Sang-yeob as Park Tae-ha
Lee Geon-ha as child Park Tae-ha
Gong Seung-yeon as Kim Da-hae
Lee Go-eun as child Kim Da-hae

Supporting characters

Goongrakwon
 as Min Seon-ho (Head of Noodles)
Cha Do-jin as Lee Gi-baek (2nd Head of Noodles)
Kim Min-ho as Kim Jin-hak
Choi Dae-seong as Na Won-sang (Head of Meats)
 as Park Moon-bok (Head of Broth)
Son San as Kim Jin-nyeo (Head of Banchan)
 as Hong Cheo-nyeo (2nd Head of Banchan)
 as Ha Tae-bong (Restaurant Manager)

Extended cast
Kim Jae-young as Go Gil-yong
Ahn Won-jin as child Go Gil-yong
Choi Jong-won as Go Dae-cheon
Lee Ye-hyun as Go Gang-seok
Lee Il-hwa as Go Gang-sook
Seo Yi-sook as Seol Mi-ja
Jo Hee-bong as Dokku Jin
Kim Byung-ki as So Tae-seob
Um Hyo-sup as Senator Choi
Son Yeo-eun as Do Hyun-jeong
Kim Joo-wan as Hwang Sung-rok (Kim Gil-do's assistant)
 as Ha Jeong-tae
Noh Young-hak as teen Ha Jeong-tae
Oh Yoon-hong as Choi Ok-shim (Choi Soon-seok's mother)
 as Lee Myung-shik (orphanage director)
Park Ji-hwan as Doo-chul
Kwak Dong-yeon as Lee Yong-joo (Park Tae-ha's prison mate) 
Chae Min-hee as Chae Yeo-kyung's teacher and friend
Cha Jung-won as Kim Da-hae's friend
 

Ji Seong-geun
Ham Jin-seong

Im Hyung-taek
Yoo Geum
Kim Hyun

Shin Chi-young

Kwon Hong-seok
Dan Kang-ho

Kwon Oh-soo
Lee Young-jin as Kim Kyung-jang
Choi Byung-mo as Ahn Joong-yong

Oh Hwa-yeol
Choi Yong-jin

Cameo appearances
Ryu Hyun-kyung as Kim Seon-joo (Kim Da-hae's mother)

Ratings 
In the table below, the blue numbers represent the lowest ratings and the red numbers represent the highest ratings.

Awards and nominations

Notes

References

External links
  
 
 

Korean Broadcasting System television dramas
2016 South Korean television series debuts
2016 South Korean television series endings
South Korean melodrama television series
South Korean cooking television series
Television series by Celltrion Entertainment